The Barnston Memorial is an obelisk in Churton Road, Farndon, Cheshire, England.  It commemorates Roger Barnston, a military officer who died in 1857 from wounds sustained at the Siege of Lucknow.  His memorial consists of an obelisk standing on a plinth, surrounded by four lions.  It is recorded in the National Heritage List for England as a designated Grade II* listed building.

History
Major Roger Barnston served in the Crimean War, and later in India, where he died, at the age of 31, on 23 December 1857 from wounds sustained at the Siege of Lucknow in the Indian Rebellion. At a parish meeting in 1858 it was decided to provide a memorial to him.  Subscribers raised a total of £426.55.  Following a competition, a design by Edward A. Heffer was selected.  The cost of the memorial came to £400.

Description
The memorial consists of a slender obelisk standing on a plinth. The obelisk starts from a concave curve, and there is a similar curve in the plinth, which contribute to the appearance of slimness. Around the plinth are statues of four crouching lions, which are described as "mourning", or "snoozing".  
On the west side of the plinth, facing the road, is carved the word BARNSTON, and below this is a circular plaque containing a wreath.  On the east side is an inscription readings as follows.

The memorial was designated as a Grade II* listed building on 28 November 1984.  Grade II* is the middle of the three grades of listing designated by English Heritage, and is granted to "particularly important buildings of more than special interest".

See also

 Grade II* listed buildings in Cheshire West and Chester
 Listed buildings in Farndon, Cheshire

References

1858 sculptures
Buildings and structures completed in 1858
Obelisks in England
Monuments and memorials in Cheshire
Grade II* listed buildings in Cheshire